"It's All Coming Back to Me Now" is a power ballad written by Jim Steinman. According to Steinman, the song was inspired by Wuthering Heights, and was an attempt to write "the most passionate, romantic song" he could ever create. The Sunday Times posits that "Steinman protects his songs as if they were his children". Meat Loaf had wanted to record the song for years, but Steinman saw it as a "woman's song". Steinman won a court movement preventing Meat Loaf from recording it. Girl group Pandora's Box went on to record it, and it was subsequently made famous through a cover by Celine Dion, which upset Meat Loaf because he was going to use it for a planned album with the working title Bat Out of Hell III. Alternately, Meat Loaf has said the song was intended for Bat Out of Hell II and given to the singer in 1986, but that they both decided to use "I'd Do Anything for Love (But I Won't Do That)" for Bat II, and save this song for Bat III.

The song has had three major releases. The first version appeared on the concept album Original Sin, recorded by Pandora's Box. It was then recorded by Celine Dion for her album Falling into You, and her version was a commercial hit, reaching No. 2 in the U.S. Billboard Hot 100 and No. 3 in the UK Singles Chart. Meat Loaf eventually recorded it as a duet with Norwegian singer Marion Raven for Bat III and released it as a single in 2006. This version reached No. 1 in Norway and No. 2 in Scotland.

A music video was produced for each of the three versions; death is a recurring theme in all of these videos, fitting in with the suggestion in Virgin Records' press release for Original Sin that "in Steinman's songs, the dead come to life and the living are doomed to die".

Inspiration

Influenced by Emily Brontë's novel Wuthering Heights, Steinman compared the song to 'Heathcliff digging up Cathy's corpse and dancing with it in the cold moonlight', a scene which does not exist in the novel. In this conceptualization, which Steinman imagines having been censored from the book, the strength of Heathcliff's obsession enables a dance with a corpse on the beach despite the West Yorkshire moors being landlocked (and therefore more than the laws of nature would allow):

This isn't the Wuthering Heights of Kate Bush—that little fanciful Wuthering Heights. The scene they always cut out is the scene when Heathcliff digs up Catherine's body and dances in the moonlight and on the beach with it. I think you can't get much more operatic or passionate than that. I was trying to write a song about dead things coming to life. I was trying to write a song about being enslaved and obsessed by love, not just enchanted and happy with it. It was about the dark side of love; about the ability to be resurrected by it... I just tried to put everything I could into it, and I'm real proud of it.

In another interview, Steinman expands on his comments about the song being about the 'dark side of love'.

It's about obsession, and that can be scary because you're not in control and you don't know where it's going to stop. It says that, at any point in somebody's life, when they loved somebody strongly enough and that person returns, a certain touch, a certain physical gesture can turn them from being defiant and disgusted with this person to being subservient again. And it's not just a pleasurable feeling that comes back, it's the complete terror and loss of control that comes back. And I think that's ultimately a great weapon.

The website AllMusic called the song 'a tormented ballad about romantic loss and regret built on a spooky yet heart-wrenching piano melody'. The torment is present in the song's opening ('There were nights when the wind was so cold'), from which the singer recovers ('I finished crying in the instant that you left... And I banished every memory you and I had ever made'). However, the defiance in the verses are replaced by the return of the 'subservient' feelings in the chorus ('when you touch me like this, and you hold me like that...'); this juxtaposition continues throughout the song.

'There were those empty threats and hollow lies
'And whenever you tried to hurt me
'I just hurt you even worse and so much deeper.'

Eroticism is implied in the lines 'There were nights of endless pleasure' and 'The flesh and the fantasies: all coming back to me'. The song ends with a passionate, quiet reprise of the chorus. Critics have also identified Wagner, of whom Steinman was an admirer, as an inspiration. Specifying this song, The Sunday Times said "the theme of Wagner's opera Tristan and Isolde, with its extreme passions and obsessive love, informs all his best work".

A 2007 article in the Toronto Star claims that the song was written as Steinman's "tryout" as lyricist for Andrew Lloyd Webber's Sunset Boulevard.

Pandora's Box version

In 1989, Steinman produced a concept album, Original Sin, with an all-female group called Pandora's Box. The album featured many tracks that would later be recorded by other artists, particularly Meat Loaf. Elaine Caswell was the lead vocalist for "It's All Coming Back to Me Now", who apparently collapsed five times during its recording. Caswell has since performed the song as part of The Dream Engine at Joe's Pub in New York City.

For the track, Roy Bittan performed on the grand piano, with Steinman and Jeff Bova on keyboards. Guitars were by Eddie Martinez, with Steve Buslowe on bass guitar and Jimmy Bralower on drums. Todd Rundgren arranged the background vocals, which were performed by Ellen Foley, Gina Taylor, and Deliria Wilde. The song was released as a single in the United Kingdom on 2 October 1989 and reached No. 51 in the UK Singles Chart. In its review of the album, Kerrang! magazine called the song 'excruciatingly operatic'.

Ken Russell directed the video, which was filmed at Pinewood Studios in Buckinghamshire. Steinman wrote the script, based on Russell's "Nessun Dorma" segment in the compilation opera movie Aria. Scholar Joseph Lanza describes the video:

a woman's near-death experience [from a motorcycle crash] is set amid operatic excesses and black leather. In a simulated city engulfed by an apocalyptic blaze, British vocalist Elaine Caswell sings and participates in a ritual to celebrate the song's "nights of sacred pleasure"... [The soundstage] is stocked with gravestones, motorcycles, python and dancers (allegedly from the London production of Cats), strapped in chaps, studded bras, and spiked codpieces.

The girl, near death, is being ministered to by paramedics, fantasizing and being 'sexually aroused by a large python and writhing on a bed that lit up in time with the music, while surrounded by a group of bemused, semi-naked dancers'. When Steinman's manager saw it, he responded 'It's a porno movie!' The two-day shoot ran over schedule and budget, costing £35,000 an hour. Russell and Steinman even designed a sequence where a motorcyclist would cycle up the steps of a local church-tower, jump out of the turrets at the top, and then explode; alas, the wardens of the church refused permission.

The 7-inch, 12-inch, and CD singles featured Steven Margoshes's piano solo "Pray Lewd" (containing elements of "It's All Coming Back to Me Now"), Steinman's monologue "I've Been Dreaming Up a Storm Lately", and "Requiem Metal", a sample from Verdi's Requiem Mass, all from the album Original Sin.

Charts

Celine Dion version

"It's All Coming Back to Me Now" is the first track on Canadian singer Celine Dion's fourth English-language studio album, Falling into You (1996). Jim Steinman produced the track, with Steven Rinkoff and Roy Bittan credited as co-producers. Bat Out of Hell and Meat Loaf collaborators Todd Rundgren, Eric Troyer, Rory Dodd, Glen Burtnick and Kasim Sulton provided backing vocals. This version utilized a modified version of the original Pandora's Box track with Caswell's vocals and certain instrumental passages removed. It peaked at number two on Billboard Hot 100 for five weeks, becoming the thirty-fourth biggest number two Hot 100 hit of all time. The full-length version of the song is the version that appears on Falling into You and is seven minutes and thirty-seven seconds long. A radio edit of the song was made, which appears on all editions of Dion's first English-language greatest hits album, All the Way... A Decade of Song (1999), and lasts for five minutes and thirty-one seconds.

According to The Sunday Times, Andrew Lloyd Webber told Steinman he thought this song was "the greatest love song ever written," and on hearing Dion's version reportedly said: "This will be the record of the millennium". In an interview with the Canadian Broadcasting Corporation, Elaine Caswell said that she expressed shock upon hearing Dion's version, often leaving a scene when the song came out in places such as laundromats in tears. Caswell later met Dion when she joined her to record a cover of "River Deep – Mountain High". The singer revealed that she had listened to Caswell's vocals in the original version and hoped she could match her voice.

The song was also included in Dion's 2008 greatest hits compilation My Love: Essential Collection. Live performances can be found on the A New Day... Live in Las Vegas and Taking Chances World Tour: The Concert albums. Dion performed this song during her Falling Into You: Around the World tour 1996/1997, Let's Talk About Love World Tour 1998/1999, Taking Chances World Tour 2008/2009, two Las Vegas residencies, A new Day... and Celine, Tournée Européenne 2013, Summer Tour 2016, 2017 European tour and her 2018 tour. She performed the song during her British Summer Time concert in London's Hyde Park on 5 July 2019, and also opened her 2019-2020 Courage World Tour show with the song.

Critical reception
Dion's version received widespread critical acclaim. AllMusic senior editor Stephen Thomas Erlewine marked it as a standout along with "Falling into You", and praised it, "Celine shines on mock epics like Jim Steinman's 'It's All Coming Back to Me Now.'" Larry Flick from Billboard asked, "Is there a pop diva hotter than Dion right now?" He added, "Lesser talents might have been gobbled up by his melodramatic arrangements, but Dion rises to the occasion with a performance that soars above the instrumentation with deliciously theatrical flair." A reviewer from the Calgary Sun stated, "[The song] is undoubtedly the highlight of her English-language recording career. Celine's over-the-top vocals soar and swoop around Steinman's epic, ostentatious arrangement. Not surprisingly, everything else that follows... pales in comparison". Pip Ellwood-Hughes from Entertainment Focus called it "one of the finest songs the singer has ever recorded. It shows the power of her voice as well as the subtle emotion she can display in the quieter moments. The song is nothing short of a rock opera and Dion is the perfect person to sing it." Toronto's Eye Weekly said Steinman's "fatal absence from the last Meat Loaf record is finally justified here." Dave Sholin from the Gavin Report felt that Steinman's "dramatic writing style melds perfectly with her powerful vocal, giving this production an incredibly passionate quality". The Miami Herald said Dion "knocks a couple out of the ballpark... [the song] features seven minutes of Wagnerian bombast, thunderclap piano chords and emoting that would wither an opera diva. Sure, it's over-the-top but it's passionate and musical".

British magazine Music Week rated it four out of five, picking it as Single of the Week. The reviewer added, "You don't need to be a musical genius to spot this melodramatic builder as a Jim Steinman number and, while the overblown style isn't to everyone's taste, this should be huge." Stephen Holden from The New York Times wrote, "The melodrama peaks with two overblown Jim Steinman productions: 'It's All Coming Back to Me Now', a romantic flashback replete with thunderclaps... " People magazine stated that literally, it "blasts off the CD with a booming piano chord followed by seven minutes of Wagnerian melodrama, Dion's crystalline soprano swelling and trembling with operatic abandon worthy of the Ring cycle's immolation scene." Richmond Times-Dispatch picked it as one of the best tracks on the Falling into You album. Sun-Sentinel noted it as "lyrically and musically beautiful" and said that "this nearly eight-minute ballad sets the pace for this album with Dion's emotional singing." Christopher Smith from TalkAboutPopMusic called it "the biggest spectacle" of the album, and "a complete album in itself".

Some other reviews were less enthusiastic. After labelling Celine "a Madonna-meets-Meat Loaf vocal freak", The Vancouver Sun described the song as "intensely self-indulgent, pompously self-important and mediocre beyond belief, the song just never ends". The Ottawa Sun called it 'turgid', while The Toronto Sun, coincidentally, said that it "sounds like a Meat Loaf reject".

Music video

British director Nigel Dick directed the music video for Dion's version, with Simon Archer as cinematographer and Jaromir Svarc as art director. It was shot between 29 June and 3 July 1996 in the Ploskovice summer palace of the Austrian Emperors and Barandov Studios, Prague, Czech Republic; it was later released in July 1996. Castle Ploskovice in Ploskovice supplied the exterior of the gothic mansion. There are two versions of this music video; the full version (about 7:44 in length) and the single version (about 6:00 in length). Both of them are included on Dion's 2001 DVD video collection All the Way... A Decade of Song & Video.

The video opens with a man being thrown off his motorcycle, after lightning strikes a tree down in his path - eventually killing him in the process. Dion's character is haunted by her lover's image, which she sees through a mirror, and images of them together through picture frames. There are stylistic similarities to Russell Mulcahy's video for Steinman's "Total Eclipse of the Heart", to the extent that Slant Magazine calls Dick's video an update. On 10 January 2020, the music video reached 100 million views on YouTube.

Impact and legacy
Smooth Radio listed "It's All Coming Back to Me Now" at number 19 on their list of the "Greatest Power Ballads of All Time". Pitchfork listed the song as one of "The 250 Best Songs of the 1990s", saying, "Dion, the most successful balladeer of the ’90s, summons all the power in her soul and lungs to commune with the dead, the theatrically proggy arrangement crescendoing behind her."

Track listings and formats

Australian CD and cassette single
"It's All Coming Back to Me Now" (Radio Edit) – 5:27
"To Love You More" – 5:29
"Where Does My Heart Beat Now" (Live Version) – 5:30
"Fly" – 2:58

Australian/US CD single (Remixes) 
"It's All Coming Back to Me Now" (Classic Paradise Radio Mix #1) – 4:20
"It's All Coming Back to Me Now" (Classic Paradise Radio Mix #2) – 3:47
"It's All Coming Back to Me Now" (The Moran Anthem 7" Edit) – 4:20
"It's All Coming Back to Me Now" (Classic Paradise Mix) – 8:12
"It's All Coming Back to Me Now" (The Moran Anthem Mix Pt. 1) – 10:32

Canadian/European/US CD and UK/US cassette single
"It's All Coming Back to Me Now" (Radio Edit) – 5:27
"The Power of the Dream" – 4:31

European CD single
"It's All Coming Back to Me Now" (Radio Edit) – 5:27
"It's All Coming Back to Me Now" (Classic Paradise Mix) – 4:22

European CD single
"It's All Coming Back to Me Now" (Radio Edit) – 5:27
"The Power of the Dream" – 4:31
"Fly" – 2:58
"Where Does My Heart Beat Now" (Live Version) – 5:30

European/UK CD single (Love to Infinity mixes)
"It's All Coming Back to Me Now" (Album Version) – 7:37
"It's All Coming Back to Me Now" (Classic Paradise Mix) – 8:17
"It's All Coming Back to Me Now" (Prophet Mix) – 7:04
"It's All Coming Back to Me Now" (Aphrodisiac Mix) – 7:47
"It's All Coming Back to Me Now" (Amnesia Mix) – 7:33
UK CD single
"It's All Coming Back to Me Now" (Radio Edit) – 5:27
"Le fils de Superman" – 4:35
"Fly" – 2:58
"The Power of the Dream" – 4:31

US 12-inch single 
"It's All Coming Back to Me Now" (Classic Paradise Mix) – 8:12
"It's All Coming Back to Me Now" (The Moran Breakdown Dub) – 9:22
"It's All Coming Back to Me Now" (The Moran Anthem Mix Pt. 1) – 10:32
"It's All Coming Back to Me Now" (Amnesia Mix) – 7:37

US promo CD single 
"It's All Coming Back to Me Now" (Radio Edit 1) – 5:27
"It's All Coming Back to Me Now" (Radio Edit 2) – 6:03
"It's All Coming Back to Me Now" (Album Version) – 7:42

US promo CD single 
"It's All Coming Back to Me Now" (Advanced Radio Edit) – 5:24

US promo 2x12-inch single 
"It's All Coming Back to Me Now" (Classic Paradise Mix) – 8:12
"It's All Coming Back to Me Now" (Amnesia Mix) – 7:37
"It's All Coming Back to Me Now" (The Moran Anthem Mix) – 14:38
"It's All Coming Back to Me Now" (The Moran Breakdown Dub) – 9:22
"It's All Coming Back to Me Now" (Prophet Mix) – 7:01
"It's All Coming Back to Me Now" (Aphrodisiac Mix) – 7:47
"It's All Coming Back to Me Now" (The Moran Virtuous Dub) – 8:25

Personnel
Roy Bittan - grand piano
Jeff Bova - keyboards, programming
Jimmy Bralower - drums, percussion
Steve Buslowe - bass
Tim Pierce - guitar
Eddie Martinez - additional guitars
Kenny Aronoff - additional drums
Bashiri Johnson - additional percussion
Todd Rundgren, Eric Troyer, Rory Dodd, Glen Burtnick, Kasim Sulton - background vocals

Charts

Weekly charts

Year-end charts

Decade-end charts

All-time charts

Certifications and sales

Release history

Meat Loaf and Marion Raven version

In interviews, Meat Loaf has said that, in his mind, the song was always meant to be a duet. It was recorded as a duet by Meat Loaf and Marion Raven for the album Bat Out of Hell III: The Monster Is Loose, produced by Desmond Child. Raven had been working on her solo album with Child, and was chosen because the timbre of her voice starkly contrasts to Meat Loaf's. In promotional interviews, Meat Loaf said that "I believe that the version that Marion Raven and myself did on this album is the definitive version".

Meat Loaf said that he was in tears when he first heard the song, which he stated is "the only time that's happened". He has also said that the song could refer to Steinman and himself, with an array of emotions coming back every time they work together. Referring to lines like 'when I kiss you like that', he said that although "I love Jim Steinman", he wouldn't French kiss him.

To me it wasn't a song about romance, it was about me and Jim Steinman. We'd had a load of problems with managers in the early '80s and all of a sudden after five years we started to communicate. After I'd been to his house, he sent me the song, and it was "It's All Coming Back To Me Now". Not the line 'When you kiss me like that', but the emotional connection. It doesn't have to be literal.

P. R. Brown directed this video, which premiered on VH1 Classic on 8 August 2006. There are similarities between the video for Meat Loaf's version of the song, and that the video for that of Celine Dion, with Meat Loaf being haunted by the memory of his lover. It is structured differently, however, with the story being told through flashback. Shots when Raven's character is alive have a distinct yellow tint, with a darker, blue tint for those after her death. Whereas the motorcyclist dies before the first verse in the Dion version, Raven's crash and resulting death is not shown until the final chorus. Meat Loaf becomes angry with Raven because the ghost of Raven's former lover appears at a masquerade ball they are attending (some reviewers have compared this to the Stanley Kubrick film Eyes Wide Shut).

This version of the song replaces the word 'nights' with 'lights', in the line 'There were nights of endless pleasure'. The ending of the single version is different, concluding with an additional 'We forgive and forget and it's all coming back to me now'. The album version, following those recorded by Pandora's Box and Celine Dion, ends with Raven whispering 'And if we...', followed by four piano notes.

The track was available to download from iTunes in the United Kingdom in August 2006, two months before its UK release on 16 October. The CD single includes the song "Black Betty", with the limited-edition 7-inch vinyl featuring "Whore", a rock duet with Patti Russo; it was also released as a DVD single. The album version was made available on Meat Loaf and Marion Raven's respective MySpace sites in August, with the single version being played during some of their promotional interviews, such as that on BBC Radio 2. The cover art is by Julie Bell, who is also the artist for the album Bat out Of Hell III.

The single entered the UK Singles Chart at No. 6 on 22 October 2006, giving Meat Loaf his highest position in the UK chart since "I'd Lie for You (And That's the Truth)" reached No. 2 in 1995, and was the last UK Top 40 hit in his lifetime. The song also reached No. 1 in Raven's native Norway, as well as No. 7 in Germany. Critical reaction was generally positive, with The Guardian saying that the song is "ostensibly a reflection on love, but imbued with the delicacy of aircraft carriers colliding at sea".

Marion Raven joined Meat Loaf for his 2007 tour of Europe. She was the supporting act, promoting her album Set Me Free. Meat Loaf introduced her again on stage at the latter stages of the concerts to duet on "It's All Coming Back to Me Now". A performance was recorded and released on DVD as 3 Bats Live.

Charts

Weekly charts

Year-end charts

Uses in popular culture

Céline Dion's version
  Dion's version appears in a 2018 TV commercial for Applebee's.
  Dion’s version (and herself) appear in a commercial for “Instagram shopping” in 2019.
  Dion's version appears in the return of National Football League in 2020, in which the pop diva was featured in a video that has gone viral promoting the NFL's return, which features the players lipsyncing and belting along with the timeless hit.
 Dion's version appears on Extra Gum's commercial, titled "For When It's Time", made by BBDO and filmed in Santiago, Chile, in early March 2021.
 Dion's version was used as the finale lip-sync song in season 2 of Canada's Drag Race between the top three contestants Icesis Couture, Pythia, and Kendall Gender.
 The upcoming romantic drama film Love Again (a remake of SMS für Dich that Dion executive produced and stars in) had been titled It's All Coming Back to Me after the song. The song itself appears in the film's trailer.

Other versions
 This song features in Jim Steinman's Bat Out of Hell: The Musical, in which the song is split into further parts and is performed by four characters.
 The TV series Glee featured a short cover of this song in the third-season episode "Nationals", in which it is performed by Lea Michele as Rachel Berry. A longer 5:22 minute version of Michele performing this song was released as a digital single in 2012.

See also

1996 in British music
Billboard Year-End Hot 100 singles of 1996
Billboard Year-End Hot 100 singles of 1997
List of Billboard Mainstream Top 40 number-one songs of the 1990s
List of Billboard Hot 100 top 10 singles in 1996
List of Billboard Hot 100 top 10 singles in 1997
 List of most expensive music videos
List of number-one adult contemporary singles of 1996 (U.S.)
List of number-one singles of 1996 (Canada)
List of number-one songs in Norway
List of UK top 10 singles in 1996
List of UK top 10 singles in 2006
Ultratop 50 number-one hits of 1996

References

External links

1989 songs
1989 singles
1996 singles
2006 singles
1980s ballads
550 Music singles
Celine Dion songs
Columbia Records singles
Epic Records singles
Male–female vocal duets
Marion Raven songs
Meat Loaf songs
Mercury Records singles
Music based on novels
Music videos directed by Nigel Dick
Number-one singles in Norway
Pandora's Box (band) songs
Pop ballads
Rock ballads
RPM Top Singles number-one singles
Song recordings produced by Jim Steinman
Songs written by Jim Steinman
Works based on Wuthering Heights
Virgin Records singles
Song recordings with Wall of Sound arrangements